Virginiatown (formerly, Virginia) is an unincorporated community in Placer County, California.

Virginiatown is California Historical Landmark #400.

References

Unincorporated communities in California
Unincorporated communities in Placer County, California
California Historical Landmarks